The Austin A30 is a small family car produced by Austin from May 1952 to September 1956. It was launched at the 1951 Earls Court Motor Show as the "New Austin Seven" and was Austin's competitor with the Morris Minor.

At launch, the car cost £507 (equivalent to £15,793.36 in 2019) undercutting the Minor by £62.

Styling
Though Austin had previously contracted the American industrial designer, Raymond Loewy in the task, the designs of Holden 'Bob' Koto were discarded and the car we know was eventually styled in-house by Ricardo 'Dick' Burzi.

Features
The body structure was designed by T.K. Garrett, who had been an aeronautical engineer before joining Austin. It was of fully stressed monocoque chassis-less construction, which made it lighter and stiffer than most contemporary vehicles, the first Austin to be made in this way. Inside there were individual seats at the front and a bench at the rear covered in PVC with an option of leather facings on the seats. Evidence of economy was seen in only having a single windscreen wiper, central combined stop/tail/numberplate lamp and a sun visor in front of the driver only. A passenger-side wiper and sun visor, and a heater were available as optional extras.

Originally only offered as a 4-door saloon, 2-door variants were introduced in late 1953, and in 1954 a van and van-based "Countryman" estate were made available. Despite having a smaller loading capacity than the equivalent BMC O-type Minor based vans (60 cu ft / 1.70 m3 as opposed to 76 cu ft / 2.15 m3) the Austin van offered the same payload. Being slightly lighter and stiffer, it was favoured by businessmen, and saw long service for many.

The A30 was replaced by the Austin A35 in 1956, by which time 223,264 A30s had been built.

The A30 had a smaller rear window than the A35 and trafficators instead of modern indicators, which popped out from the B pillar when operated by a knob mounted on the centre of the dashboard.

The car, along with the larger-engined (and hence faster) A35, was quite successful in 1950s saloon car racing, and some still appear in historic events.

Performance 
The car's newly designed A-Series straight-4 engine was state of the art for the time and returned an average fuel consumption of 42 mpg / under 7L/100 km. Braking was effected by a hybrid system, with Lockheed fully hydraulic drum brakes at the front and a body-mounted single cylinder operating rods to the rear wheels, which despite being heavily criticised as archaic and old-fashioned, were reported to be quite acceptable. The rod system provided good handbrake efficiency and was applied by a lever in an unorthodox position to the right of the driver's seat (Right hand drive vehicles). Bumps were handled by independent coil springs at the front end and beam axle/semi-elliptic leaf springs at the back.

The test car cost £553 including taxes. The optional radio was an extra £43 and the heater £9. Performance data need to be seen in the context of fuel availability. Early in the Second World War "branded fuel" disappeared from sale in the UK, and the nationally available fuel available at the beginning of 1952 had an octane rating of just 70, which enforced relatively low compression ratios:  this reduced the performance available from all cars, especially small ones. In 1952 branded fuels returned to the forecourts, available octane ratings began to increase, and compression ratios were progressively improved along with the performance figures of cars such as the Austin A30 and its A35 successor.

Australian production

The A30 was produced in Australia by the Austin Motor Company (Australia) Pty Ltd from 1952 to 1954 and by its successor, the British Motor Corporation (Australia) Pty Ltd from 1954 to 1956.

Engine
 803 cc BMC A-Series engine inline 4.
 58 mm bore x 76 mm stroke
 pushrod-operated overhead valves
 compression ratio 7.2:1
 single Zenith 26JS or 26VME carburettor
 28 bhp (21 kW) at 4400 rpm
 40 lbf·ft (54 Nm) at 2200 rpm

New Austin Seven and Austin A30 Seven
Early sales literature used the names New Austin Seven and Austin A30 Seven.

References

Further reading
Post War Baby Austins (1988) Sharratt, Barney 
 Austin A30 & A35 Super Profile (1985), Henson, Kim, Haynes Publishing Group 
 Austin A30 & A35 1951 - 1962, Brooklands Books,

External links

 Austin A30/A35 Owners' Club
 The Austin A30 Site. A30 photographs, free screensaver, parts noticeboard+ 
 Austin Memories—History of Austin and Longbridge
 Photo of A30 in New Zealand, 1964

A30
1950s cars
Cars introduced in 1951
Cars of Australia
Rear-wheel-drive vehicles
Sedans